1801 California Street is a skyscraper in Denver, Colorado. The building stands as the second-tallest building in Denver and Colorado, and as the 151st-tallest building in the United States.

1801 California Street was previously occupied by offices for US West, and then served as the world headquarters of Qwest Communications. In summer 2011 following CenturyLink's acquisition of Qwest, the Qwest sign was removed from the top and replaced with the CenturyLink sign. Upon its completion in 1983, the building stood as the tallest building in the city. However, it held that distinction for less than a year, being surpassed by Republic Plaza in 1984.

The building has a brown concrete façade, and has a stepped design featuring four setbacks. It is an example of late-modernist high-rise architecture. The shape of the building resembles two interlocked octagonal sections, which separate near the building's roof. Therefore, when measuring by pinnacle height, 1801 California Street remains the tallest building in Denver.

1801 California Street once held the distinction of hosting the brightest high-rise signs in the world, surpassing even the brightly lit high-rise logos found on the skyscrapers of Shanghai and Hong Kong. Four Qwest logos were installed in 2000, after the corporation moved their offices from 555 17th Street, situated two blocks away. However, Qwest removed the signs in 2004 due to increasing complaints from residents of Downtown Denver and rising energy costs, and the lights were replaced with ones of a darker blue color. 
In December 2011, Brookfield Office Properties acquired 1801 California Street from Public Service Enterprise Group for $215 million.

In October 2015 the Transamerica logo was added to the skyscraper. On November 2, 2015 Transamerica relocated its Denver operations to 1801 California and now occupies several floors of the building.

In the lobby of the building is an Ink Coffee and 1801 Eatery, and the Guard and Grace steakhouse. Brookfield sold a 51% interest in the property to AFL-CIO Building Investment Trust for $286 million on March 30, 2018. 

Exterior shots of the building were used as the setting for Colbyco in the television series Dynasty.

See also
List of tallest buildings in Denver
List of tallest buildings in the United States

References

Skyscraper office buildings in Denver
Office buildings completed in 1982
Telecommunications company headquarters in the United States
Lumen Technologies
1982 establishments in Colorado
Brookfield Properties buildings
Leadership in Energy and Environmental Design gold certified buildings